Victor Vladimirovich Khryapa (also trans. Viktor; ; born August 3, 1982) is a Russian former professional basketball player who spent the majority of his career playing for CSKA Moscow of the VTB United League.

A regular member of the senior Russian former national basketball team, he was instrumental in their triumph at the EuroBasket 2007, where they won the gold medal. He also won two bronze medals at the EuroBasket 2011 and at the 2012 Summer Olympics.

Professional career

Europe
Khryapa played for Khimik Engels in 1999–00, and for Avtodor Saratov in 2000–02. In 2002, Khryapa was signed by CSKA Moscow, with whom he won two Russian Championships in 2003 and 2004.

NBA
Khryapa was the 22nd overall selection of the 2004 NBA draft. He was chosen by the New Jersey Nets and then subsequently traded to the Portland Trail Blazers for Eddie Gill.  Then on June 28, 2006, he was traded to the Chicago Bulls along with Tyrus Thomas, for the rights to LaMarcus Aldridge.

In February 2008, the Chicago Bulls bought out Khryapa's contract after the forward expressed frustration with his lack of playing time. He had appeared in just nine games in the 2007–08 NBA season to that point, averaging 3.6 points per game and 2.2 rebounds per game.

Return to Europe
Khryapa intended to return to Russia as a member of CSKA Moscow, and signed with his former club on February 12, 2008, on a four and a half year contract. With CSKA he won the Russian Championship in 2008, 2009, 2010 and 2011, the VTB United League Championship in 2010 and the EuroLeague Championship in 2008. In May 2014, he was named to the All-EuroLeague Second Team of the EuroLeague, the second consecutive in his career.

Khryapa missed the first half of 2014–15 season due to an ankle injury rehabilitation. On December 10, 2014, he underwent surgery which kept him off-the-court for three months. He returned to action in a game against Laboral Kutxa on March 5, 2015. CSKA Moscow has managed to advance to the EuroLeague Final Four for the fourth straight season, after eliminating Panathinaikos for the second straight season in the quarter-final series with a 3–1 series win. However, in the semifinal game, despite being dubbed by the media as an absolute favorite to advance, CSKA once again lost to Olympiacos. The final score was 70–68, after a great Olympiacos comeback in 4th quarter, led by Vassilis Spanoulis. CSKA Moscow eventually won the EuroLeague third place game, after defeating Fenerbahçe, by a score of 86–80. Over 10 EuroLeague games played, he averaged a career-low of 1.2 points, 1.8 rebounds, and 1 assist per game.

On July 23, 2015, he re-signed with CSKA for one more season. In June 2016, CSKA used team option to keep Khryapa in the club for yet another season. He officially parted ways with CSKA on June 26, 2018, after a ten-year second stint with the club.

National team career
Khryapa was a member of the senior men's Russian national basketball team, winning the gold medal at the EuroBasket 2007. He also participated in the 2002 FIBA World Championship, the EuroBasket 2003, the EuroBasket 2005, and won a bronze medal at the EuroBasket 2011. He represented Russia in the 2008 Summer Olympics, as well as in the  2012 Summer Olympics, where Russia won another bronze medal. He was included on the Russian national team roster for the 2010 FIBA World Championship, but did not play due to an injury.

Personal life
Khyapa's older brother, Nikolai Khryapa, was also a professional basketball player.

Career statistics

NBA

Regular season

|-
| align="left" | 2004–05
| align="left" rowspan=2| Portland
| 32 || 5 || 16.3 || .435 || .364 || .548 || 3.4 || .8 || .6 || .6 || 4.2
|-
| align="left" | 2005–06
| 69 || 53 || 21.6 || .462 || .333 || .694 || 4.4 || 1.3 || .7 || .4 || 5.8
|-
| align="left" | 2006–07
| align="left" rowspan=2| Chicago
| 33 || 0 || 7.0 || .386 || .000 || .731 || 1.7 || .6 || .3 || .0 || 2.2
|-
| align="left" | 2007–08
| 9 || 0 || 11.7 || .387 || .000 || .571 || 2.2 || .9 || .7 || .0 || 3.6
|- class="sortbottom"
| style="text-align:center;" colspan="2"| Career
| 143 || 58 || 16.4 || .443 || .292 || .658 || 3.4 || 1.0 || .6 || .3 || 3.95

EuroLeague

|-
| style="text-align:left;"| 2002–03
| style="text-align:left;" rowspan=13| CSKA Moscow
| 22 || 17 || 19.0 || .500 || .414 || .750 || 5.1 || 1.1 || 1.0 || 1.3 || 4.7 || 9.3
|-
| style="text-align:left;"| 2003–04
| 20 || 17 || 17.8 || .461 || .268 || .743 || 3.4 || 1.2 || .9 || 1.0 || 5.3 || 7.5
|-
| style="text-align:left;background:#AFE6BA;"| 2007–08†	
| 9 || 0 || 10.9 || .367 || .375 || .500 || 2.2 || .4 || .4 || .2 || 3.7 || 2.3
|-
| style="text-align:left;"| 2008–09	
| 21 || 10 || 19.5 || .557 || .400 || .720 || 4.9 || 1.4 || 1.3 || 1.0 || 6.6 || 10.7
|-
| style="text-align:left;"| 2009–10
| 22 || 22 || 31.3 || .532 || .418 || .689 || 6.3 || 4.0 || style="background:#CFECEC;"| 2.0 || .9 || 10.1 || 15.3
|-
| style="text-align:left;"| 2010–11
| 3 || 0 || 19.0 || .273 || .333 || 1.000 || 5.0 || 2.3 || 1.0 || .0 || 3.0 || 8.0
|-
| style="text-align:left;"| 2011–12
| 20 || 19 || 22.6 || .454 || .414 || .816 || 4.0 || 3.3 || .9 || .5 || 8.2 || 10.0
|-
| style="text-align:left;"| 2012–13
| 26 || 26 || 27.8 || .520 || .452 || .771 || style="background:#CFECEC;"| 7.3 || 3.7 || 1.7 || .8 || 10.3 || 17.0
|-
| style="text-align:left;"| 2013–14
| 28 || 28 || 23.8 || .476 || .385 || .667 || 5.4 || 4.3 || .9 || .4 || 6.5 || 12.5
|-
| style="text-align:left;"| 2014–15
| 10 || 0 || 7.8 || .250 || .250 || .833 || 1.8 || 1.0 || .2 || .6 || 1.2 || 3.0
|-
| style="text-align:left;background:#AFE6BA;"| 2015–16†
| 10 || 3 || 16.3 || .568 || .316 || .444 || 3.7 || 1.8 || .4 || .8 || 6.0 || 8.8
|-
| style="text-align:left;"| 2016–17
| 32 || 11 || 13.4 || .475 || .184 || .821 || 3.6 || 1.8 || .8 || .3 || 3.8 || 6.8
|-
| style="text-align:left;"| 2017–18
| 16 || 3 || 6.6 || .475 || .333 || .500 || 1.4 || .4 || .3 || .1 || 1.6 || 1.4
|- class="sortbottom"
| style="text-align:center;" colspan="2"| Career
| 240 || 156 || 19.4 || .481 || .372 || .728 || 4.5 || 2.3 || 1.0 || .7 || 6.8 || 9.6

References and notes

External links

 
 Victor Khryapa at cskabasket.com
 Victor Khryapa at draftexpress.com
 
 Victor Khryapa at euroleague.net
 Victor Khryapa at fiba.com
 Victor Khryapa at nba.com
 Victor Khryapa at vtb-league.com

1982 births
Living people
2002 FIBA World Championship players
2010 FIBA World Championship players
Basketball players at the 2008 Summer Olympics
Basketball players at the 2012 Summer Olympics
BC Avtodor Saratov players
Chicago Bulls players
FIBA EuroBasket-winning players
Medalists at the 2012 Summer Olympics
National Basketball Association players from Russia
New Jersey Nets draft picks
Olympic basketball players of Russia
Olympic bronze medalists for Russia
Olympic medalists in basketball
PBC CSKA Moscow players
Portland Trail Blazers players
Power forwards (basketball)
Russian expatriate basketball people in the United States
Small forwards
Basketball players from Kyiv